Sir Roderick Sheldon Deane  (born 8 April 1941) is a New Zealand economist, public sector reformer, and businessman. He served as deputy governor of the Reserve Bank of New Zealand, and as CEO and chairman of the country's largest telecommunications company, Telecom New Zealand.

Education
Born in Auckland, Deane grew up in Ōpunake and went to New Plymouth Boys' High School. He completed a Bachelor of Commerce degree with first-class honours in economics and a doctorate in economics at Victoria University of Wellington in 1968. During his doctoral research, Deane began corresponding with future Reserve Bank Governor Don Brash, forming a friendship that would continue throughout their careers.

Career

Reserve Bank of New Zealand
Deane worked at the Reserve Bank of New Zealand, rapidly becoming Chief Economist, then Deputy Governor in 1982. During this period, Deane tended to clash with Prime Minister and Finance Minister Robert Muldoon, arguing for more economic liberalisation and sounder economic policies, although Deane described his personal relationship with Muldoon as "cordial" and "civil". Muldoon twice appointed a Governor to the Reserve Bank in preference to Deane.

Deane served as Alternate Executive Director of the International Monetary Fund from 1974 to 1976. While at the Reserve Bank, Deane published numerous papers on monetary, exchange-rate, and fiscal policy, as well as in the fields of international economics. He led a research-team which developed New Zealand's first macroeconometric model and published many papers in this area. He authored and edited a range of books on monetary policy and financial-sector matters, the external sector and foreign investment. Deane later became the inaugural winner of the NZIER Qantas "Economist of the Year" Award.

Currency and constitutional crisis of 1984

In 1984, with the election of the Fourth Labour government, Deane led those elements within the Reserve Bank calling for a devaluation of the New Zealand dollar. Speculation on international markets that the incoming New Zealand government would devalue the currency led to the Reserve Bank needing to defend the fixed currency in the markets, causing losses of hundreds of millions of dollars. The defeated Prime Minister, Muldoon, refused to devalue the currency; a constitutional crisis ensued, during which the incoming Government directed Muldoon to devalue. During the crisis, Deane took the unprecedented step of closing the New Zealand currency to international trading pending settlement of the dispute.

State Services Commissioner
In 1986 Deane became Chairman of the State Services Commission, effectively the head of New Zealand's public service. Along with Minister of Finance Roger Douglas, Deane served as the principal architect of state-sector reform and corporatisation of New Zealand's State-Owned Enterprises. He also oversaw a range of other reforms to the public sector, including changes in the wage determination processes to liberalise these, the re-organization of the public service to reduce substantially the number of public servants and to improve the efficiency of many government departments, and changes designed to improve the clarity of objectives and the enhancement of accountabilities within the public sector.

In 1986–87 he was called on to investigate the Māori Loan Affair.

In 1987 Deane became Chief Executive of New Zealand's then-largest state-owned enterprise, the Electricity Corporation of New Zealand (ECNZ), often known as Electricorp. Don Hunn succeeded Deane as State Services Commissioner.

Telecom Chief Executive
In November 1992, following the privatisation of Telecom as New Zealand's largest listed company, Deane became Chief Executive of the new entity. He held this role until his retirement on 1 October 1999, when he became the non-executive Chairman of Telecom. In the "Top 200 Corporate Awards", Deane became CEO of the Year in 1994, CEO of the Decade in 1999 and later Chairman of the Year.

Deane also served as Chairman of ANZ National Bank from 1999 and for many years as a Director of the ANZ Banking Group in Melbourne. He chaired the Board of the National Museum of New Zealand, Te Papa Tongarewa from 2000, which encompasses what was previously the National Art Gallery. He formed the City Gallery Wellington Foundation and functioned for many years as its chairman. In 2006 Deane announced his resignation from these positions to provide time to pursue other interests which he had been developing for some years. In the case of Telecom, the decision to resign followed particularly the Government's decision to force Telecom to unbundle the local loop, a decision with which he said he fundamentally disagreed.

Retirement and voluntary activities
 Deane remains a Director of Woolworths Ltd in Sydney and Chairman of the New Zealand Seed Fund. He was Chairman of New Zealand's largest listed company, Fletcher Building Limited from 2001 to 31 March 2010. He had earlier served as Chairman of the Fletcher Challenge Group and oversaw a major restructuring of that Group in 1999–2000 to rationalise and improve its performance. This involved several commercial transactions which were the largest of their kind at that time. Deane also sits on the advisory board of Pacific Road Corporate Finance.

Deane and his wife Gillian have actively supported the arts as patrons for many years, and they currently serve as Joint Patrons of the IHC New Zealand, the country's largest voluntary welfare organisation. The Deanes' late daughter Kristen was eventually diagnosed with Rett syndrome.

Deane occupied over many years senior positions in the IHC, including that of President, and oversaw a period of great change for people with an intellectual handicap, change enabling them to live more normal lives in the wider community. Closure of the country's special schools and psychopaedic institutions facilitated this process, which also involved young people moving into normal schools and IHC buying many hundreds of houses to provide an environment as close as possible to normal living for intellectually handicapped people in regular communities.

From 2000 to 2003 Deane held a personal Chair as Professor of Economics and Management at Victoria University of Wellington, which awarded him an honorary Doctorate of Laws.

Honours

In 1990, Deane was awarded the New Zealand 1990 Commemoration Medal. In 2009, he was inducted into the New Zealand Business Hall of Fame.

In the 2012 Queen's Birthday and Diamond Jubilee Honours, Deane was appointed a Knight Companion of the New Zealand Order of Merit.

References

Further reading

External links
 independenteconomics.com Roderick Deane's website

1941 births
People educated at New Plymouth Boys' High School
Living people
New Zealand bankers
New Zealand chief executives
20th-century New Zealand economists
New Zealand public servants
Victoria University of Wellington alumni
Academic staff of the Victoria University of Wellington
People from Ōpunake
Knights Companion of the New Zealand Order of Merit
Businesspeople awarded knighthoods
21st-century New Zealand economists